= Water Transmission and Technologies Company =

The Water Transmission and Technologies Company (WTTCO) is owned by the Saudi Arabian government and headquartered in Riyadh, Kingdom of Saudi Arabia. The company was established through the separation and commercialization of the production and transmission assets of the Saline Water Conversion Corporation (SWCC). The establishment of WTTCO was based on Resolution No. 32, dated 11/1/1441 AH, and approved by the Council of Ministers of the Kingdom of Saudi Arabia.

WTTCO operates as a commercially independent entity and will grow with the launch of new water projects in Saudi Arabia. The company is responsible for managing and maintaining water transmission, storage, and distribution operations across the country, while also driving innovation in water technologies and research. WTTCO provides its services through an integrated network of pipelines spanning more than 8,400 kilometers that are dedicated to serving Saudi Arabia's water desalination requirements.
